The Ford Focus is a compact car (C-segment in Europe) manufactured by Ford Motor Company since 1998. It was created under Alexander Trotman's Ford 2000 plan, which aimed to globalize model development and sell one compact vehicle worldwide. The original Focus was primarily designed by Ford of Europe's German and British teams.
Production of the fourth generation Focus began in 2018 in Germany and China.

Naming 
The decision to name the new car the "Ford Focus" was made in early 1998, as Ford's senior management had been planning to keep the "Escort" nameplate for its new generation of small family cars. A last-minute problem arose in July 1998 when a Cologne court, responding to a case brought by the publisher Burda, ordered Ford to avoid the name "Focus" for the cars in the German market since the name was already taken by one of its magazines (Focus). This eleventh-hour dispute was resolved, however, and the car was launched with the name Focus.

First generation (C170; 1998) 

Ford of Europe introduced the Focus in 1998 to the European market as a replacement for the Ford Escort. The Focus MK1 was awarded the 1999 European Car of the Year award. The project manager for the Ford Focus at Dunton was Rose Mary Farenden.

Ford of North America began marketing the Focus in September 1999 for the 2000 model year, with some changes from the European version. The car was launched as a three-door hatchback, four-door sedan, and five-door wagon; a five-door hatchback debuted in 2001.

In 2002, Ford launched its highest performance version of the Focus, called the Focus RS. It came with a 2.0-litre turbocharged Duratec RS engine, a Quaife ATB limited-slip differential, an AP Racing clutch, Sachs Racing dampers Brembo brakes, 18” O.Z Racing alloy wheels, Michelin Pilot Sport tyres and a host of other performance changes, combined with a much more aggressive appearance, and was available only in Ford's Imperial blue. Tickford Engineering won the engineering contract for the research, development and to oversee production of the Mk 1 Focus RS.
Tickford made substantial modifications to the base unit, with up to 70% of the base components either uprated, re-engineered or completely redesigned. Despite the development being carried out in the United Kingdom, Ford produced the Focus RS in the Saarlouis plant in Germany between 2002 and 2003 making a limited run of 4501 cars only. This original Focus RS was only available in Europe; just under half (2147) of these were sold in the UK.

For decades, in the U.S., small cars like the Focus were seen as a tool to draw in younger buyers looking for a cheap basic transportation and to increase auto makers' fleet average fuel economies to meet U.S. federal standards. Ford was said not to be concerned about losing money on the Focus so the company could sell gas guzzlers for big profits. However, recent sales of new Focuses have been able to maintain lower or overall discounting incentive rates than many competing vehicles in its class. Many industry insiders view cars like the Focus as 'compliance cars' because of their role in helping to bring up the corporate fleet average fuel economy to meet current fuel-economy standards.

Second generation

Europe (C307; 2004)

The second generation Focus was launched at the Paris Motor Show on September 25, 2004, as a three and five-door hatchback and an estate, although the new car was previewed, in 4-door sedan form, as the "Focus Concept" developed by Ford Europe at the Beijing Motor Show in mid-2004.

The basic suspension design, which contributed much to the Mk 1's success, was carried over largely unchanged from its predecessor. Along with a 10 percent stiffer bodyshell, according to Ford this offers a better ride, but critics claimed the car lacked the precise and poised handling of the Mk 1. The same body styles as the Mk 1 Focus were offered, though the sedan did not appear until mid-2005. A two-door coupé-cabriolet with a retractable hardtop was added to the line-up in 2007.

The Focus Mk 2 is larger and considerably heavier than its predecessor: it has a  increase in wheelbase, and is  longer,  taller, and  wider. As a result, the interior and boot space have increased. New technologies include a KeyFree system, a solar-reflect windshield, adaptive front lighting, Bluetooth hands-free phones and voice control for audio, telephone, and climate control systems.

Stylistically, the Mk 2 features the same design language found in the Mondeo and Fiesta. Although still recognisable as a Focus, the new car uses styling features from the abandoned B-Proposal for the original Focus which never reached production.

In 2005, Ford released a MK.II version of Ford's sports division of Focus, the Focus ST. This one produced  and could achieve a  time of 6.4 seconds, and a  top speed, using a 2.5-litre, five-cylinder turbocharged engine originating from Volvo.

2007–2008 saw a minor facelifted version introduced, featuring Ford's Kinetic Design philosophy. Major changes included a new bonnet with more creases, the removal of all mouldings along the doors and sides, new sculpted pull back headlights, and the big trapezoidal lower grille.

In 2009, the new Focus RS was launched, with a modified version of the 2.5-litre engine found in the ST.

North America (C170; 2007)

For the North American market, development followed a separate path. Since debuting at the 2007 North American International Auto Show, the restyled 2008–2011 generation was available as a two-door coupe and four-door sedan; the hatchbacks and wagon were discontinued. The interior was redesigned, including new seats, a new dashboard design with message center on top of the dashboard, ambient lighting, dashboard panels that simulate brushed aluminum, and Ford's voice-controlled Sync audio/Bluetooth system. Also included in the redesign was a support beam behind the dashboard for extra structural rigidity.

Though informally considered as the second generation, it was never officially referred to as such by Ford since its platform was the same as the first generation.

Third generation (C346; 2010)

For the third generation, Ford reunited both international and North American models by releasing the international Mk3 worldwide. The previous North American version was discontinued, and the new model was launched simultaneously in North America and Europe in early 2011, both having started production late in 2010.

Ford unveiled the Ford Focus at the 2010 North American International Auto Show. The car shown was a five-door hatchback model, also debuting a new 2.0-litre direct injection inline-four engine. A five-door station wagon was also made available at launch. The new generation launched simultaneously in North America and Europe in early 2011, with production having started in late 2010. Production in Asia, Africa, Australia and South America was scheduled to follow later but the plan for Australian production was later dropped and that market and New Zealand were supplied, along with Asia, from a new factory in Thailand where output began in June 2012.

Ford previewed the third generation facelifted model at the 2014 Geneva Motor Show. The updated version features a new redesigned front end design, incorporating Ford's new family grille and slimline headlights. The Focus RS was updated to include all-wheel drive.

Fourth generation (C519; 2018)

On April 10, 2018, Ford unveiled the European and Asian-market versions of the fourth-generation Focus, to mark the brand's 20th anniversary. As in the previous generation, the model is available with sedan, hatchback and estate body styles. A crossover-inspired trim level known as the Active is available with the hatchback and estate body styles. The car also has a Vignale luxury trim level.

The exterior features a sportier design, while Ford described its interior as being simpler. The company also emphasized technology featured in the new model, including the Sync 3 infotainment system, FordPass Connect, and the CoPilot360 driver assistance suite.

In April 2018, Ford announced that all passenger vehicles but the Mustang would be discontinued in the  North American market, in order to focus on trucks and SUVs. The Focus Active was intended to be the only version of the model available in the market, but Ford cancelled these plans in August 2018 over tariffs imposed by the U.S. government on exports from China, as the model would be manufactured in the country.

Ford limited sales of fourth generation Focus in its 4-door saloon form in Estonia, Latvia, Lithuania, Serbia, Montenegro, North Macedonia, Albania, Bulgaria, Romania, Moldova, Turkey, Cyprus as well as many Asian and African countries. Ford no longer offers the Focus in Russia, Belarus and Kazakhstan due to a broader reorganization of their European branch.

In April 2020, Ford confirmed there are no plans for a fourth-generation Focus RS model due to pan-European emissions standards and high development costs.

In October 2021, the model received a facelift for the European market.

In 2022, it was announced that Ford would discontinue the Focus by 2025, as part of a pivot towards crossover vehicles and electrification.

Motorsport

Rallying

The first Focus World Rally Car made its debut in rallying and the World Rally Championship on the 1999 Monte Carlo Rally with Colin McRae and Simon Jean-Joseph at the wheels of the two cars, replacing the Escort. It was immediately on the pace, setting many fastest stage times, but an illegal water pump meant that the two cars were excluded from that event. McRae went on to give the Focus WRC its maiden victory on the Safari Rally in February of the same year, and took victory again in the following rally, the Rally Portugal.

The MkI Focus WRC went on to achieve further victories over the years for McRae, Carlos Sainz, and Markko Märtin from then until it was phased out in favour of the MkII offering in late 2005. This car, a winner in both Marcus Grönholm's and Mikko Hirvonen's hands in the two-car factory BP-Ford World Rally Team that contested the 2006 World Rally Championship, duly racked up the manufacturers' title, spelling the end of a formidable twenty-seven-year wait for such an honour in this series for the Blue Oval. The team successfully defended the manufacturers' title in the 2007 season. The Focus WRC was used until the 2010 season, when it was announced that the new Fiesta will replace the Focus from 2011 and onwards.

All the rally cars are built, prepared, and run for Ford by M-Sport, the motorsport team based in Cockermouth, Cumbria in Northern England. The team is managed by Malcolm Wilson, a well known British former rally driver.

Touring cars
Besides rallies, the Focus has also been used in the SCCA Speed World Challenge Touring Car Series, the TC 2000, resulting champion in 2003, 2005, 2010, and 2012.

A Focus was entered into the 2006 Swedish Touring Car Championship season.

The Ford Focus ST made its debut in the 2009 British Touring Car Championship season, with Arena Motorsport. During its second season, the car ran on liquefied petroleum gas, taking the first BTCC win for a car powered by this fuel at Brands Hatch. In 2011, Arena (also known as Team AON) shifted to the newer Focus Mk3, while Motorbase Performance drove the ST version. Both cars had engines built to the Next Generation Touring Car engine rules. Motorbase continues to compete with the Ford Focus ST.

This car won four drivers' championships of the Argentine TC 2000/Súper TC 2000 championship (2003, 2005, 2010 and 2012). The first three of the Oreste Berta Ford YPF team with official support from Ford Argentina.

Arena Motorsport entered two Ford Focus Mk3s in the 2012 World Touring Car Championship season for Tom Chilton and James Nash. The best result was a sixth place by Nash in the Race of Morocco.

In 2008 Ford South Africa entered two modified Focus ST models into Class T (reserved for turbocharged production vehicles) of the local Bridgestone Production Car Championship (essentially a Touring Car formula). They secured the Class T driver's titles in 2009 and 2011.

The car had success in the 2013 China Touring Car Championship, and won its class in the 2014 Liqui Moly Bathurst 12 Hour. The Focus that raced in the 2014 Bathurst 12 Hour was powered by a 5.0 L Ford Coyote V8 engine.

Sales

Future 
Stuart Rowley, chair and former president of Ford of Europe, told journalists in June 2022 that Ford plans to end production of the Focus at the Saarlouis plant in Germany around 2025. There was no indication of when production would end in China.

References

External links

 

 Official brochures: 2001, 2002, 2003, 2004, 2005, 2006, 2007, 2008, 2009, 2010, 2011, 2012, 2013, 2014, 2015, 2016

 
Cars powered by transverse 4-cylinder engines
Compact cars
Front-wheel-drive vehicles
Partial zero-emissions vehicles
Sedans
Touring cars
Cars introduced in 1998

2000s cars
2010s cars
2020s cars
Station wagons